MV Earl Thorfinn is a Ro-Ro vehicle ferry operated by Orkney Ferries.

History
MV Earl Thorfinn was built by McTay Marine in Bromborough on Merseyside in 1989.

Service
MV Earl Thorfinn is normally used on Outer North Isles services, connecting Kirkwall with Eday, Sanday, Stronsay, Westray, Papay, and North Ronaldsay.

References

External links

1990 ships
Transport in Orkney
Ferries of Scotland